The Federal Republic of Germany had conscription (Wehrpflicht) for male citizens between 1956 and 2011. On 22 November 2010, the German Minister of Defence proposed to the government to put conscription into abeyance on 1 July 2011. The constitution, however, retains provisions that would legalize the potential reintroduction of conscription.

The Grundgesetz (Basic Law for the Federal Republic of Germany) and several special laws (e.g., Wehrpflichtgesetz) were regulating these duties and the exceptions.
During the last year when conscription was active, men were obliged to serve six months either in the military, which they could refuse, and do alternative civilian service, or honorary service (like any volunteer) for at least six months in a civil protection organisation.

Families of those who were oppressed by the Nazi regime (usually Jews) were exempted from conscription, though some volunteered to serve. Although conscription was of a military nature, in the last days of conscription twice as many draftees refused military service and served in alternative services. Women were not subject to conscription; they were allowed to join the military as volunteers.

History of conscription

Military service for conscripts

Draftees who did not state that they were conscientious objectors and did not request service in the civil protection were by default drafted into military service (Wehrdienst) in the Bundeswehr (German federal defense forces).

Basic training (Allgemeine Grundausbildung) consisted of three months of combat training, then three months' service at the assigned post. The conscripted soldier would normally reach the rank of Obergefreiter (NATO code OR-3, comparable to U.S. Army Private First Class). During his service, he got free health care, housing, food, and a railway ticket allowing him to travel between his home and the military base. Conscripts got paid between €9.41 and €10.95 per day of basic pay (depending on rank) plus several bonus payments such as distance-from-home pay, additional food pay for days absent from service and others.

Conscripts could not be deployed to active service in conflicts against their will. The German contributions to forces such as ISAF in Afghanistan or KFOR in Kosovo exclusively comprise professional soldiers and volunteers. Conscripts who wished to partake in such missions must have volunteered for it; this included volunteering for a service extension (because the time of compulsory service, 9 months at most of the time in question, would not have sufficed for recruit training, post-specific training, mission-specific training, mission, and post-processing the mission put together).

Service in Civil Protection Services

Draftees could also opt for service in the Civil Protection, which was by law equal to military service. Today, this consists mostly of medical ambulance organisations and organisations for disaster relief (Katastrophenschutz). This was subject to validation by local authorities, who usually were allowed a certain contingent of such volunteers per year of birth. Thus, organizations such as the Technical Relief Service (Technisches Hilfswerk, or THW), volunteer fire departments, or other emergency assistance and crisis management agencies such as the Red Cross were supported in performing their volunteer services in disaster response. In the ambulance services, their service could overlap with the service of conscientious objectors. 

Draftees in the Civil Protection got no payment outside of compensations for clothing and transportation expenses, as they were performing an honorary service (ehrenamtlich).

Conscientious objection
The German "Basic Law" requires that conscientious objection be possible, therefore draftees were allowed to perform civilian alternative service ( or ). The conscientious objection had to be declared in a personal letter to the local draft office (Kreiswehrersatzamt), with an appendix outlining one's moral objections. The draft office then sent this appendix to the Bundesamt für den Zivildienst (Federal Office for Civilian Service) for approval or denial. From 1983, the denial of a conscientious objection claim was quite rare, previously, the objector had to defend the validity of his claim in front of a committee at the Draft Office itself. These must have been directed against war and military service in general, without regard to the circumstances, and, if they had been finally rejected (which was then a common occurrence), the only legal recourse was to challenge the decision in administrative court. While the option of conscientious objection is required by law, in the past there were several hurdles in place to discourage it.

Those who objected had to perform civilian alternative service, lasting the same amount of time as military service, plus one additional month, during which they may have found employment with a civilian institution that renders a public service, such as a kindergarten, hospital, rehabilitation center or assisted living facility for the elderly. Alternative service could be more convenient than military service since the draftee could continue living at home rather than in military barracks. 

Before German reunification in 1990, citizens of West Berlin were exempt from the draft as West Berlin formally did not belong to the FRG. Some young men moved to Berlin immediately upon their high school graduation in order to avoid the draft entirely, and thus did not serve in either the military or in an alternative service.

In East Germany, conscripts who were not willing to bear arms were drafted into the National People's Army as "construction soldiers". They were used in public construction projects, and sometimes also to fill worker shortages in various parts of the East German economy, such as the mining industry. Men who served as "Bausoldaten" were frequently subjected to discrimination by the East German state, even after they had finished their service. For example, former "Bausoldaten" were often barred from enrolling in university.

Duration and payment
The German constitution also requires that the duration of civilian service does not exceed that of military service.

Since 2003 civilian service had the same duration in months as military service. Before, there was a rate in hours both services had to serve, which was then divided by the average daily work hours in military and civil service. Thereby, civil service tended to be 1–3 months longer than military service, as the former used to have 50 working hours a week as against 40 working hours in civil organisations. This made four "military weeks" equivalent to five "civil weeks". This practice was abolished when the draft duration was reduced from 10/12 months to 9/9 and later 6/6 months.

Exemption from service 
Women were not included in the draft, but they could serve voluntarily. Since 1975 women were allowed to serve in medical and music band functions. In 2001 the European Court of Justice ruled that limiting women to these functions was against European law. Subsequently, all positions in the Bundeswehr were opened up for women.

Under a deal between the German Defense Ministry and the Central Council of Jews in Germany, Jews up to the third generation of Holocaust victims were exempted from the military service obligation, but could still volunteer for military service. For decades, volunteering for military service was taboo in the German-Jewish community, but eventually, Jews began joining. In 2007, there were an estimated 200 Jewish soldiers serving in the Bundeswehr.

Men could be exempted from the service requirement for various other reasons. The most frequent reason for exoneration was a medical exemption. All conscripts, including conscientious objectors but excluding those exempt for other reasons, had to attend a medical examination at the local county draft bureau. Those who did not fulfill certain standards did not have to serve, either in the military or in a civilian service.

Delinquents sentenced to more than a year or charged with a felony against peace, democracy, the state, or state security were not drafted for military service. 

Priests were not drafted. Another provision exonerated everyone from military service who had two siblings who had already served. The same was true for men whose fathers, mothers, or siblings died in military or civil service. Men who were married, living in a registered civil union, or had children were also free to choose. 

Workers performing tasks in areas of important public interest could be exempted from military service on request. This mostly applied to policemen, career firefighters, and specialists in telecommunication or engineering services.

Alternative services to Zivildienst

Another alternative was to become a foreign "development helper" ("Entwicklungshelfer"), which means that the person would be expected to work in a technical capacity in a recognized "developing country" for a period of not less than two years. To qualify for this option, the candidate had to meet the requests of the chosen agency which includes formal vocational training or an educational program that grants a recognized qualification in a marketable skill making him a useful asset in a developing host country. Many men who chose this option, become so engrossed in the developmental needs of such countries that they stayed abroad many years longer than the legal requirement. The disproportionately high percentage of German nationals found in many international aid, conservation, medical and technical assistance organizations active in developing countries may be directly attributable to this trend.

Women and undrafted men may have opted in to serve one year of voluntary service in a social or environmental institution, called "Freiwilliges Soziales Jahr" (FSJ) and "Freiwilliges Ökologisches Jahr" (FÖJ), respectively. It was not a real alternative to military service, but for most practical purposes identical to the civilian alternative service that conscientious objectors were required to serve. This included social security coverage for the term of service and might have given the young attendee a direction for their later career as well as a certain improvement in soft skills.

Total resisters (Totalverweigerung)

If a conscripted man refused to serve in the military or do any alternative service, this man was to be subject to legal prosecution and may have been sentenced to confinement in prison. In 2007 a 20-year-old was arrested by the Bundeswehr for being AWOL (Absent Without Official Leave). The sentence was dependent upon the way the conscripted man refuses to serve. In the military it was dealt with under military law. In the civilian alternative service it was AWOL. The court is never a court-martial. The accused was often dealt with by juvenile law and in theory could be punished by a term of imprisonment of up to 5 years or fined. In practice, 3 months was often imposed, as only longer first-time punishments are recorded in the "certificate of good conduct" Polizeiliches Führungszeugnis.

Political debate to suspend conscription
The post-Cold War downsizing of the Bundeswehr led to a considerable decrease in demand for young conscripts. Of all men reaching draftable age, less than one half actually served. In 2005 about 15% served in the military, while 31% performed civilian service or some other form of alternative service. More than 36% were screened out for medical reasons. This percentage was lower in the past (15% in 2003), but to avoid drafting more men than needed, medical standards had been raised. The remainder includes those who were exempt for various reasons, but is mostly made up of men who were not drafted because the military had already reached its recruitment goals. This had led to discussions about "draft equality", which is the principle that the draft should have applied equally and non-discriminatorily to all men.

Historical arguments
Proponents of the draft argue that it conserved the military's firm rooting in civilian society and warn that a professional army might return to the militaristic, anti-democratic and elitist traditions of the Nazi and German Empire eras, despite the fact that those regimes practiced conscription. Draft service is sometimes defended as a tradition dating back to the 1848 Revolution, intended to ensure the continuity of the democratic state.

Military arguments
Military detractors of the draft claimed that shortening the service to six months, which was necessary to accommodate a constant number of conscripts in a shrinking army, had made conscription worthless because conscripts receive too little training. Military proponents countered that some service is better than none at all, bringing citizens in contact with their military and thereby countering above-mentioned fears of a disconnection between military and society.

Another factor was the armed forces' difficulty to find volunteers for senior positions beyond the conscript level. Many soldiers in advanced ranks were recruited from former conscripts who volunteer to extend their service. Abolishing the draft could close this pathway into the military. Therefore, military leaders fear that the abolition of the draft would lead to recruitment shortages even for higher ranking positions.

Financial arguments
Some detractors of the draft expect considerable savings in defence spending from abolishing the draft, because it would allow a downsizing of the armed forces, which owe much of their current size to the need to accommodate large numbers of conscripts. It is arguable how such a reduction in size would affect the Bundeswehr's capabilities. Those in favor of a downsizing claim that it would not affect the ability to act in conflict theatres, since conscripts cannot be involuntarily deployed to such areas, making such missions already today the domain of a quasi-professional army.

Experiences of countries who have abolished draft, especially the United States and France, show that professional armed forces can be more expensive than a draft-based military. Professional armies need to pay their soldiers higher wages, and have large advertising expenses to attract sufficient numbers of able recruits. The above-mentioned difficulties in recruiting soldiers for advanced ranks, as well as difficulties in retaining such higher-ranking soldiers whose term of service time ends, indicates that a professional army might have to make considerable financial efforts to be competitive as an employer.

Civic arguments
Civilian detractors argue that the draft was simply anachronistic, instilling an undue sense of militarism in young men, and also delaying their entry into the workforce. Others argued that especially young people often detached themselves from their community, consuming its benefits but trying to avoid its duties. The draft obliged male citizens to pay society back through their military or civilian service.

Furthermore, abolishing the draft also meant abolishing civilian service. A purely civilian compulsory service would be incompatible with the German basic law, which permitted the draft only for the purpose of defense. This caused a considerable drop in the number of people working in the care of children and elderly people. Such care facilities often relied on civilian service to furnish them with large numbers of very low-paid workers.

Apart from that, professional forces tend to be recruited largely from underprivileged groups. As of 2007, a disproportionate number of soldiers (about 4 out of 10) who volunteer beyond their basic service stem from the poorer eastern states of Germany. It is feared that a professional force increases this trend, disconnecting the armed forces from the more affluent groups in society.

Further mandatory services 
In Germany, beside the suspended military service, a few other mandatory services feasible or even implemented by law in some municipalities.

Border Guard Service 
By constitutional law a Compulsory Border Guard Service in the Federal Police (German: Bundespolizei)—the renamed Federal Border Guard (German: Bundesgrenzschutz) can be implemented. Currently the draft is suspended in peacetime like the draft for the military service.

Compulsory Fire Service 
A Compulsory Fire Service for a local fire department is in force in a handful of municipalities.

Dyke Relief Service 
In the case of floodings and crevasse the Dyke Relief Service (in German: Deichhilfe) can be set in force, citizens can be drafted by municipalities cleanup services or to make dykes safe.

Hand and hitch-up services 
So-called hand and hitch-up services or more contemporary the (mandatory) municipal services is an obligatory service, that can be requested by a local government and is still enforced in small townships to maintain municipal properties and infrastructure.

References

External links
 More Jews Opt to Serve in German Military
 Der Wehrbeauftragte des Deutschen Bundestages (official site, English)

Conscription in Germany
Germany